Salsoul Records is an American New York City based record label, founded by three brothers, Joseph Cayre, Kenneth Cayre, and Stanley Cayre (the Cayre brothers). Salsoul issued about 300 singles, including many disco/post-disco 12-inch releases, and a string of albums in the 1970s and early 1980s.

The label started in business in 1974, went defunct in 1985 and was relaunched in 1992. Artists such as The Salsoul Orchestra (led by Vincent Montana Jr), Aurra, Skyy, Inner Life, Rafael Cameron, Edwin Birdsong, Instant Funk, Loleatta Holloway, Civil Attack, Double Exposure, Love Committee(Gold Mind), First Choice, Joe Bataan, The Strangers, Moment of Truth, Vaughan Mason & Butch Dayo, Carol Williams, Jocelyn Brown, and Charo were at one time part of their roster.

Bethlehem Music Company's catalogs, which included Salsoul Records, Bethlehem Records (a jazz label) and others, were licensed by Verse music group from 2010 for five years, before Verse's catalogs were bought out by BMG Rights Management in 2015.

History

Early days
The Cayre family had been involved in many entrepreneurial ventures before they manufactured and distributed 8-track tapes, which included Bethlehem Records, in the early 1970s. They had purchased some catalogs of Mexican music to distribute, and infringed on the copyrights of CBS Records and RCA Records by selling them in the United States. They acquired a license for North American distribution for some of CBS's Latino catalog. This led to recording sessions that were distributed by CBS. When CBS was unable to increase profits, the rights reverted to the Cayres.

Origin of name
The label's name was conceived by artist Joe Bataan, who recorded some of the earliest sessions for the Cayre brothers before the label's formation. "Salsoul" was street lingo for the musical culture of urban Latinos who were listening to soul music and combining it with salsa music. Bataan chose the name for an LP he made for the Cayre brothers. Bataan had the first single, "The Bottle", and album, Afro-filipino, on the initial Salsoul label released through Epic, before a deal with RCA.

1970s: Influence from Philly soul
Ken Cayre sought session musicians to play Philly soul. He worked with the key session players for Gamble and Huff's Philadelphia International Records label and its predecessor, Gamble-Huff Productions, founding members of the MFSB Orchestra on Philadelphia International.

Gamble and Huff were in dispute with their key musicians over business matters and Salsoul quickly took the chance to put them under contract. Among these Philly soul artists were Vince Montana (orchestral arrangements and vibes), Norman Harris (lead and rhythm guitar, arrangements, songwriting and production), Ronnie Baker (bass guitar, arrangement and production), Earl Young (drums and percussion), Bunny Sigler and others. Baker, Harris and Young are now widely credited with crystallizing the sound and structure of a disco record. 
Earl Young's 16 beat of the hi-hat cymbal originated a staple '70s disco beat for dancers. Baker would create a thunderous bass sound, exemplified on the record "Love is the Message" by MFSB.

Baker, Harris and Young had the girl group First Choice under contract and they brought them along to Salsoul. Led by Rochelle Fleming, the group had success on the Philly Groove label with Armed and Extremely Dangerous (1973), which Salsoul acquired and would re-release among its classic catalogue in the 1990s. For Salsoul, First Choice would record "Dr. Love" (1977) and "Let No Man Put Asunder".

Montana wrote, arranged, and produced second single and the first Salsoul hit, "Salsoul Hustle" (1975) by the newly formed Salsoul Orchestra, which included members of the Philly session players. During the following years, the label enjoyed a string of hits, but Salsoul's biggest successes came in the later years, as the company moved from disco to funk. Instant Funk reached the top of the Billboard R&B chart (No. 20 pop) in 1979 with "Got My Mind Made Up", a million-seller produced by Bunny Sigler, with the group's follow-up album also going gold. Cayre brothers also produced Flashlight (Philly Groove Records).

According to Ken Cayre, it was his exposure to early discothèques that gave him the idea to record music for the dance market. Salsoul released the first commercially available 12-inch single, Double Exposure's "Ten Percent", in 1976. Salsoul was affected by the disco backlash of 1979, but it was one of the few labels to survive after the death of disco. It continued to release new material until 1984, when the Cayre brothers shut down their recorded music operations to concentrate on the home video business, such as GoodTimes Entertainment.

1980s
Skyy made it to No. 1 R&B in 1981 with "Call Me" (No. 26 pop) and Aurra climbed to No. 6 R&B in the same year with their release, "Make Up Your Mind" (No. 71 pop). Sigler also reached the R&B top 10 in 1978 with his solo single "Let Me Party With You" (No. 8 R&B, No. 43 pop) on the Gold Mind subsidiary.

The Cayres recorded at the same studios, Sigma Sound, as Gamble & Huff in Philadelphia. It was one of the earliest facilities to install 24-track equipment  and owned a "live roos" for small orchestras. Many of the remixes and singles were mixed or recorded by Bob Blank at his studio.

Revival
In 1992, Salsoul Records was revived as Salsoul New Generation Records (also known as Double J Records). Because of the resurgent interest prompted by Loleatta Holloway's "Love Sensation", Black Box's "Ride On Time" & Marky Mark and the Funky Bunch's "Good Vibrations" in the late 1980s and early 1990s, the label's catalogue was digitally remastered.  Two volumes of remix albums were also issued the same year.

More than a year beforehand, also in "Ride on Time" by House pioneers Black Box, which was at first criticised by fans of vintage Salsoul and Ms. Holloway herself, but after legal matters were settled, many lauded the Italian DJ group for exposing an entire new generation to the Salsoul Sound. A year after revival, Salsoul changed its name to Bethlehem Music Company, but it still used Salsoul as an imprint, with Bethlehem Music Company focusing on releasing Salsoul material and also Bethlehem's jazz recordings.

In 1992 and 1993 Salsoul sub-label Double J released two volumes of remixes (Synergy and Rhythm) by contemporary house-music artists.

See also
List of record labels
Prelude Records

References

External links
Ken Cayre interview

 
American record labels
Record labels established in 1974
Record labels disestablished in 1985
Record labels established in 1992
Re-established companies
Disco record labels
Post-disco record labels